Yang Berhormat Dato' Haji Nik Mohd Amar bin Abdullah (born 29 July 1959) is a Malaysian politician, who currently serves as the Deputy Menteri Besar of Kelantan and the councilor of the Kelantan State Executive Council.

Family background 
Dato' Nik Amar is the eldest child of the late Haji Abdullah bin Haji Arshad (known as Pak Nik Lah) and Hajjah Tengku Chik binti Tengku Ibrahim. Dato' Nik Amar's mother was the great-granddaughter of Sultan Muhammad III through his grandmother YM Tengku Halimah binti Tengku Long Zainal Abidin ibni Sultan Muhammad III.

He was given the title Nik Mat (Nik Mohd) by Tok Ku Puan who took care of him as a child. The local community in Kampung Panchor is more friendly calling him Nik Amar until now. Similarly, his father, nicknamed Pak Nik Lah, was taken from the wife of his grandfather Haji Arshad bin Muhammad Tahir bin Tera a scholar better known as Tok Ayah Kedah who married YM Raja Meriam binti Raja Daud who was a descendant of Raja Jembal.

Dato' Nik Amar now has children (2 boys and 2 girls) as a result of living together with Datin Hajjah Hasmani Binti Husain. His eldest son Taqiyuddin Mohd Amar a Hafiz Al-Quran and an outstanding student at MTAQ Pulai Chondong passed away in June 2004.

Education 
Since childhood, Dato' Nik Amar was educated by his father and lived together and received his early education at Sekolah Menengah Ugama (Agama) Tarbiah Mardhiah, Panchor. At the same time Dato' Nik Amar studied in Sekolah Melayu Council (1965 - 1971) and proceed to the Master of Philosophy (MPhil) in United Kingdom.

 1965 - 1971 Sekolah Melayu Majlis - Primary School
 1972 - 1977 SMU (A) Tarbiah Mardhiah - Secondary School (Lower 6)
 1978 - 1979 Maahad Muhammadi Men - Secondary School (Upper 6)
 1979 - 1983 Universiti Kebangsaan Malaysia (UKM) - Bachelor of Islamic Studies
 1985 - 1988 University of Birmingham, UK - MPhil in Theological Studies

Career and politics 
Before being active in politics, Dato' Nik Amar was a Lecturer in the Department of Revelation, International Islamic University Malaysia (IIUM), Petaling Jaya, Selangor and served for 10 years (1985-1995). He also previously served as the Superintendent of Customs (Sangkut) for a year in Penang. He was subsequently called by the PAS Kelantan leadership to contest in the Pengkalan Chepa parliamentary seat and then contest as Panchor ADUN until now. Apart from being in the Kelantan State Assembly, Dato' Nik Amar is also a Member of the PAS Central Working Committee and Deputy Commissioner I of PAS Kelantan until now.

Election results

Honours
  :
  Knight Commander of the Order of the Life of the Crown of Kelantan (DJMK) – Dato' (2009)
  Knight Grand Commander of the Order of the Life of the Crown of Kelantan (SJMK) – Dato' (2015)

References

Living people
People from Kelantan
Malaysian people of Malay descent
Malaysian Muslims
Malaysian Islamic Party politicians
Members of the Kelantan State Legislative Assembly
Kelantan state executive councillors
21st-century Malaysian politicians
1959 births